A voting bloc is a group of voters that are strongly motivated by a specific common concern or group of concerns to the point that such specific concerns tend to dominate their voting patterns, causing them to vote together in elections. For example, Beliefnet identifies 12 main religious blocs in American politics, such as the "Religious Right", whose concerns are dominated by religious and sociocultural issues; and American Jews, who are identified as a "strong Democratic group" with liberal views on economics and social issues.  The result is that each of these groups votes en bloc in elections.

See also
Political alliance
Political party 
Votebank

References

Demographics
Bloc